List of the works of the Maître de Lanrivain.

This is a listing/"catalogue raisonnė" of the works of the Maître de Lanrivain. His work can be seen in various parts of Brittany.

Calvaries

Further reading
"Sculpteurs sur pierre en Basse-Bretagne. Les Ateliers du XVe au XVIIe Siècle" by Emmanuelle LeSeac'h. Published by Presses Universitaires de Rennes.

References

Calvaries in Brittany
Buildings and structures in Finistère